Sofronio Española, officially the Municipality of Sofronio Española,  is a 2nd class municipality in the province of Palawan, Philippines. According to the 2020 census, it has a population of 37,416 people.

It is the province's newest municipality, officially established on June 5, 1995, and Iber Chou became the first Municipality Mayor., when Republic Act No. 7679 partitioned the town from Brooke's Point. It was named after former Representative  Sofronio Española.

History 
The creation of the Municipality of Sofronio Española took nearly two decades. Resolution No. 120 dated December 12, 1988 of the Sangguniang Bayan of Brooke’s Point proposed the separation of its northern barangays, namely, Abo-Abo, Isumbo, Panitian, Labog, Punang, Iraray, Pulot Shore, Pulot Center and Pulot Interior, into a new municipality. The proposed municipality is to be called Sofronio Española in honor of the late Congressman Sofronio Española of the then lone district of Palawan. Barangay Resolution dated April 16, 1990 of Barangay Pulot reinforced this move requesting Hon. Ramon V. Mitra, Jr., then Speaker of the House of Representatives, to facilitate the creation of the new municipality.

On July 9, 1992, Hon. Alfredo E. Abueg, Jr., then congressman of the Second District of Palawan, filed House Bill No. 60, an Act Creating the Municipality of Sofronio Española in the Province of Palawan. To expedite the approval of this bill, Board Member Cipriano Barroma sponsored Sangguniang Panlalawigan Resolution No. 120 on April 16, 1993.

The House of Representatives approved Republic Act 7679, the law creating the Municipality of Sofronio Española in the Province of Palawan on August 3, 1993, and by the Senate on November 25, 1993. Finally, the law creating Sofronio Española was lapsed into law.

Section 1 of RA 7679 states that Barangays Pulot Center, Pulot Shore (Pulot I), Pulot Interior (Pulot II), Iraray, Punang, Labog, Panitian, Isumbo and Abo-Abo are to be separated from the Municipality of Brooke’s Point and constituted into a distinct and independent municipality of the province to be known as the Municipality of Sofronio Española. The seat of government shall be in Barangay Pulot Center.

Geography
The Municipality of Sofronio Española is located in Southern Palawan along its eastern seaboard, beginning at kilometer 128.1 to kilometer 166 of the National Highway (Puerto Princesa City, South Road). It lies approximately between 8 53’3.58” to 9 11’26.26” North and 117 51’24.42” to 118 7’35.58” East. It is bounded on the north by the Municipality of Narra, on the south by the Municipality of Brooke’s Point, on the east by the Sulu Sea; and on the West by the Municipality of Quezon.

Barangays
Sofronio Española is politically subdivided into 9 barangays.
 Abo-abo
 Iraray
 Isumbo
 Labog
 Panitian
 Pulot Center
 Pulot Interior (Pulot II)
 Pulot Shore (Pulot I)
 Punang

Climate
Sofronio Española is characterized by type I climate – a pronounced wet and dry season. The wet season is from May to November, while the dry season is from December to April. The prevailing winds in the municipality are the Northeast Monsoon (Amihan) and the Southwest Monsoon (Habagat). The Northeast Monsoon blows the sea into fury from November to March. The Southwest Monsoon is stronger than the Northeast Monsoon with gusts of up 60kph or more and usually blows from June to September. In between the two-monsoon wind is the lull season. This is usually during the months of April and May of every year. During this period, the sea is as smooth as glass, and since it is also the peak of the dry season, it is the best time for sea travel and other sea activities.

Demographics

Economy

References

External links
Sofronio Española Profile at PhilAtlas.com
[ Philippine Standard Geographic Code]
2000 Philippine Census Information
Local Governance Performance Management System

Municipalities of Palawan